John Bailey Rose (April 14, 1875 in Haverstraw, Rockland County, New York – March 1949) was an American politician from New York.

Life
He was the son of John Clark Rose and Martha (Bailey) Rose. He graduated Ph.B. from the Sheffield Scientific School of Yale University in 1897. He attended New York Law School in 1898, but abandoned the law, and engaged in the manufacture of brick instead. On October 5, 1898, he married Maude Moir Barclay, and they lived in Newburgh, Orange County, New York. Their only son John Barclay Rose died in 1919 of pneumonia.

Rose was a member of the New York State Senate (25th D.) from 1909 to 1912, sitting in the 132nd, 133rd, 134th and 135th New York State Legislatures.

He was President of the Greater New York Brick Company, a brick trust. In 1918, his brick and gravel companies went into receivership, and in 1919 he filed schedules in bankruptcy.

Sources
 Sexennial Record of the Class of 1897, Sheffield Scientific by Gaius Barrett Rich (1903, pg. 52)
 Official New York from Cleveland to Hughes by Charles Elliott Fitch (Hurd Publishing Co., New York and Buffalo, 1911, Vol. IV; pg. 367)
 MADE BRICK TRUST SHERMAN LAW PROOF in NYT on April 13, 1912
 BRICK TRUST INVESTIGATION in NYT on May 17, 1913
 BRICKYARD OWNERS IN THE NIGHT COURT in NYT on May 22, 1913
 J. B. ROSE'S CONCERNS IN RECEIVERS' HANDS in NYT on June 8, 1918
 BUSINESS RECORDS in NYT on April 3, 1919
 JOHN BARCLAY ROSE...died... in NYT on September 21, 1919
 JOHN B. ROSE DIES; EX-STATE SENATOR in NYT on March 5, 1949 (subscription required)

1875 births
1949 deaths
Republican Party New York (state) state senators
People from Haverstraw, New York
Politicians from Newburgh, New York
Yale University alumni
New York Law School alumni